Bez nazvaniya is the sixth studio album of Russian rock musician Nikolai Noskov, released in 2012. There are 6 tracks on the disc. The licensed version of the album was sold only at his concerts.

Album information and production 
Originally, Nikolai wanted to record the album in the UK, but because of the visa regime associated with the events at the Olympics, he decided to find a studio in another country, Nicholas recorded the album in the studio of the famous platinum producer Horst Schnebel, who worked with stars such as Bad Boys Blue and Xavier Naidoo.

The track Honey is a nostalgic song about his trip to Jamaica and traveling by train across Russia, two participants of the De-Phazz group took part in the recording. The song Confessions was re-recorded for the album. The song Night (David Tukhmanov - Vladimir Mayakovsky), which was banned in Soviet times, returned to the repertoire of the artist, and was recorded by him for the first time. The songs I was alone and Lakes were written on the poems of Nikolay Gumilyov.

Track listing 
All music written by Nikolai Noskov unless otherwise stated.

References 

Nikolai Noskov albums
2012 albums
Russian-language albums